Michael Paul Fourman FBCS FRSE (born 12 September 1950) is Professor of Computer Systems at the University of Edinburgh in Scotland, UK, and was Head of the School of Informatics from 2001–2009.

Fourman is worked in applications of logic in computer science, artificial intelligence, and cognitive science – more specifically, formal models of digital systems, system design tools, proof assistants, categorical semantics and propositional planning.

Qualifications

Fourman received a BSc in Mathematics and Philosophy from the University of Bristol in 1971, then his MSc in Mathematical Logic from the University of Oxford in 1972. He wrote his DPhil thesis Connections between Category Theory and Logic under the supervision of Dana Scott at Oxford, defending his thesis in 1974.

Career

He continued to work with Scott as an SRC postdoctoral Research Fellow and Junior Research Fellow of Wolfson College, in Oxford, until 1976, when he moved to the USA, first as a Visiting Assistant Professor of Mathematics at Clark University in Worcester, Massachusetts, then, from 1977–1982, as JF Ritt Assistant Professor of Mathematics at Columbia University in New York.

In 1983 he moved, with a Science and Engineering Research Council Fellowship, to the Department of Electronic and Electrical Engineering at Brunel University. He was appointed to a Readership, and then to the Chair of Formal Systems, at Brunel in 1986.

Fourman was co-founder and Technical Director of Abstract Hardware Limited (AHL), a company formed in 1986. He was central in the development of the LAMBDA system (Logic And Mathematics Behind Design Automation) to aid hardware design, a tool implemented in the SML programming language and marketed by AHL. He left the company in 1997.

In 1988 he joined the Laboratory for Foundations of Computer Science at the University of Edinburgh, and was appointed to the Chair of Computer Systems in the Department of Computer Science.
In 1998 he was founding Head of the Division of Informatics, which became the current School of Informatics, incorporating the former Department of Artificial Intelligence, the Artificial Intelligence Applications Institute, the Centre for Cognitive Science, the Human Communication Research Centre, and the Department of Computer Science.

He has again been Head of the School of Informatics since August 2002.

He has held visiting positions at universities in Paris (1975), Utrecht (1977, 1980), Cambridge (1979–80), Sydney (1982), Montreal (1983), and Perth (1994).

Bibliography

External links
 Full Bibliography
 Official home page
 Personal home page
 Extracurricular home page
 Blogger user profile

Clark University faculty
1950 births
Living people
20th-century British mathematicians
21st-century British mathematicians
British computer scientists
Fellows of the British Computer Society
Formal methods people
British bloggers
Alumni of the University of Oxford
Alumni of the University of Bristol
Columbia University faculty
Academics of Brunel University London
Academics of the University of Edinburgh
British logicians